Eukaryotic peptide chain release factor GTP-binding subunit ERF3B is an enzyme that in humans is encoded by the GSPT2 gene.

GSPT2 is closely related to GSPT1 (MIM 139259), a GTP-binding protein that plays an essential role at the G1- to S-phase transition of the cell cycle in yeast and human cells. GSPT1 is a positive regulator of translational accuracy and, in a binary complex with eRF1 (MIM 600285), functions as a polypeptide chain release factor.[supplied by OMIM]

Interactions
GSPT2 has been shown to interact with PABPC1.

References

Further reading

External links